The All-Ireland Senior Hurling Championship 1927 was the 41st series of the All-Ireland Senior Hurling Championship, Ireland's premier hurling knock-out competition.  Dublin won the championship, beating Cork 4-8 to 1-3 in the final.

Format

All-Ireland Championship

Semi-final: (1 match) The winners of the Munster championship were drawn to play Galway, who received a bye to this stage of the championship.  One team was eliminated at this stage while the winning team advanced to the final.

Final: (1 match) The winners of the lone semi-final and the Leinster champions contested this game with the winners being declared All-Ireland champions.

Results

Leinster Senior Hurling Championship

Munster Senior Hurling Championship

Ulster Senior Hurling Championship

All-Ireland Senior Hurling Championship

References

Sources

 Corry, Eoghan, The GAA Book of Lists (Hodder Headline Ireland, 2005).
 Donegan, Des, The Complete Handbook of Gaelic Games (DBA Publications Limited, 2005).

See also

1927